Sabine Monauni (born 10 April 1974) was the ambassador of Liechtenstein to Belgium and the European Union from July 2016 until 2021.

In August 2020 she was chosen as leader of the Progressive Citizens' Party. The party took a joint-best ten seats in the 2021 general election. As of March 25, 2021, she is the deputy prime minister of Liechtenstein also taking on the portfolio of minister of home affairs.

Education
2000–2001 Postgraduate studies in European law (LL.M.), College of Europe Bruges, Belgium
1994–1999 Studied law at the University of St. Gallen, Switzerland (lic.iur.HSG) Walter R. Schluep Prize for the best thesis of the academic year 1998/1999
1986–1994 High school Vaduz, Liechtenstein (Matura type B)

References

Deputy Prime Ministers of Liechtenstein
Ambassadors of Liechtenstein to Belgium
1974 births
Living people
21st-century Liechtenstein politicians
College of Europe alumni
Female interior ministers
Progressive Citizens' Party politicians
University of St. Gallen alumni
Women ambassadors
21st-century women politicians